George Fiske (September 28, 1891 – June 21, 1965) was an American sports shooter. He competed in the 50m free pistol event at the 1920 Summer Olympics.

References

External links
 

1891 births
1965 deaths
American male sport shooters
Olympic shooters of the United States
Shooters at the 1920 Summer Olympics
Sportspeople from Chicago